Dul Madoba is a hill ridge  southeast of Burao in Somaliland. Dul Madoba is located at an elevation of 922 metres above sea level. It was also the location of a famous battle in which the Dervishes won a victory against the British, and wherein Ibraahin Xoorane killed Richard Corfield. A native Somali account of the battle is found in the poem Annagoo Taleex naal.

Ibraahin Xoorane and Corfield
Dervish veterans of the Dul Madoba battle have claimed that Ibraahin Xoorane  killed Richard Corfield:

The colonial version of events leading to the death of Richard Corfield at the hands of Ibraahin Xoorane  is as follows:

Battle

Five British-friendly tribes were reported looted by Dervishes. This was followed by a battle that took place on 4 August 1913, between 116 men of the Camel Constabulary of British Somaliland, commanded by Colonel Richard Corfield, with the initially accompanying Dhulbahante tribesmen not partaking in the fight, and some 2,750 well-armed Dervish personnel lead by Mohammed Abdullah Hassan, nicknamed by the British as the Mad Mullah. Thirty-six of the Constabulary including Corfield were killed in action and 21 were wounded. Many of the Dervishes were also killed or wounded.

See also
Administrative divisions of Somaliland
Regions of Somaliland
Districts of Somaliland

References

Bartholet, Jeffrey. It's a Mad, Mad, Mad, Mad World, Newsweek, Oct. 12, 2009, pp. 43–47.
Battersby, Henry Francis Prevost. Richard Corfield of Somaliland (1914), ASIN: B000WFUQT8.
Jardine, Douglas. The Mad Mullah of Somaliland.
Skoulding, F.A. With 'Z' Unit in Somaliland, RAF Quarterly 2, no.3, (July 1931), pp. 387–396.

Mountains of Somaliland
Geography of Somaliland